The Contra Costa County Board of Supervisors is the governing body for Contra Costa County, California in the San Francisco Bay Area's East Bay region. Members of the Board of supervisors are elected from districts, based on their residence.

Members
As of May 4, 2018, the current supervisors for each district are:

 District 1: John Gioia, Chair
 District 2: Candace Andersen, 
 District 3: Diane Burgis
 District 4: Karen Mitchoff
 District 5: Federal Glover Vice Chair

District Composition 
Contra Costa County is divided in to five districts, each representing different communities within the county. Their composition is as follows:

 District 1: Richmond, San Pablo, El Cerrito, part of Pinole, and the unincorporated communities of East Richmond Heights, El Sobrante, Kensington, Montalvin Manor, Tara Hills, North Richmond, and Rollingwood.
 District 2: San Ramon, Danville, Alamo, Lafayette, Moraga, Orinda, Canyon, Rossmoor, Parkmead, Saranap and a portion of Walnut Creek.
 District 3: Bethel Island, Blackhawk, Byron, Diablo, Discovery Bay and Knightsen, as well as the cities of Antioch, Brentwood, and Oakley.
 District 4: Clayton, Concord, Pleasant Hill, part of Walnut Creek, and the unincorporated Contra Costa Centre.
 District 5: Hercules, Martinez, Pittsburg, portions of Pinole and Antioch, and the unincorporated communities of Alhambra Valley, Bay Point, Briones, Rodeo, Pacheco, Crockett, Tormey, Port Costa, Mt. View, Vine Hill, Reliez Valley, and Clyde.

References

External links
Official Contra Costa County Board of Supervisors website
Contra Costa County Supervisorial District Map (PDF)

Board of Supervisors
County government in California